Kamasami Kong (real name Robert W. Zix, born December 21, 1949 in Hamilton, Ohio) is an American disc jockey living in Tokyo. He has been active in Japan, Korea, and Taiwan, as well as previsously in Hawaii with the radio program "The Kamasami Kong Show" on KKUA and KIKI.

Biography 

Kong began his radio career in 1965 with the radio station WMOH. He moved to Hawaii in the late 1970s, becoming a household name in the throughout 1970s and ‘80s as Hawaii’s premiere DJ. Kong became the most listened to broadcaster on KIKI-FM while working alongside Michael W. Perry on KKUA. In 1980, he became the president of Nickong Enterprises and hosted the high school talent competition Brown Bags to Stardom in 1981 and was the original host of the TV show Breakin’ Hawaii in 1984.

In the early 2000s, Kong moved from Hawaii to Osaka due to frustration with the U.S. stations, where he became a DJ for JOFV-FM while being sponsored by Mitsubishi Motors. He wasn't allowed to be streamed except for a KTUH alumni show.

From April 2005 to March 2006, Kong was the host of the show Ride On Saturday alongside Charles St. Anthony, which interviewed Swing Out Sister, Earth, Wind & Fire, the Pussycat Dolls, Akon, Ne-Yo, Olivia Newton-John and Bananarama. In August 2007, he launched the radio show Official Hawaii Podcast for Japanese listeners with Peter Williams and Dave Erdman.

After 8 years, his Osaka show was cancelled after Mitsubishi Motors pulled funds for the show, and Kong created a podcasting show while starting to write for a column for the Japanese magazine Metropolis. He has also opened up a food chain in Taiwan called Kona Connection.

Filmography

Film

Television

Discography

Radio programs and stations

On air 
The Kong Show (Love FM, 2018–present)
Kamasami Kong Show (FM Cocolo, 2021–present)

Past programs 
Kamasami Kong Coconut Mail (FM Ōita)
Pacific Oasis (FM802, 1989–1998; FM Cocolo; 2010–2021)
NitEscape 802 (FM802)
Eternity (JFN, 2006–2009)
On Saturday Kamasami Ride Kong Show (Tokyo FM, 2005 – 2006)
Tokyo Premium Night at Cotton Club (Tokyo FM)
Aloha Break (InterFM)
Metpod (Metropolis)
Radio-i Kamasami Kong Show (Radio-i, January 2010 – September 2010)
Good Times Boo! (InterFM)
Kamasami Kong Show (FM North Wave)
Cotton Club Music Tree (TS One, 2016)
Saturday Smile (FM North Wave)

Stations 
1965 - WMOH (Cincinnati, Ohio)
1968 - WOXR (Cincinnati, Ohio)
1970 - KELP (El Paso, Texas)
1971 - AFKN (Seoul, South Korea)
1973 - KBC (Seoul, South Korea)
1975 - KMBY (Monterey, California)
1976 - KORL (Honolulu, Hawaii)
1976 - KKUA (Honolulu, Hawaii)
1979 - OBC (Osaka, Japan)
1980 - KIKI (Honolulu)
1985 - JOTU (Yokohama, Japan)
1986 - KKUA (Honolulu, Hawaii)
1986 - KDEO (Honolulu, Hawaii)
1987 - KRTR (Honolulu, Hawaii)
1987 - ICRT (Taipei, Taiwan)
1987 FM Ishikawa (Kanazawa, Japan)
1988–2005 - JOFV (Osaka, Japan)
1994 - World Chart Show (Honolulu, Hawaii)
2005 - Tokyo FM (Tokyo, Japan)
Source:

References 

American radio DJs
American radio personalities
1949 births
Living people
American expatriates in Japan
Japanese radio personalities